Borivoje Vukov (July 8, 1929 – July 1, 2010) was a Serbian wrestler who competed in the 1952 Summer Olympics, in the 1956 Summer Olympics, and in the 1960 Summer Olympics. He was born in Senta and died in Belgrade

References

External links
 

1929 births
2010 deaths
Serbian male sport wrestlers
Olympic wrestlers of Yugoslavia
Wrestlers at the 1960 Summer Olympics
Yugoslav male sport wrestlers
Wrestlers at the 1952 Summer Olympics
Wrestlers at the 1956 Summer Olympics
People from Senta
World Wrestling Championships medalists
Mediterranean Games silver medalists for Yugoslavia
Competitors at the 1959 Mediterranean Games
Mediterranean Games medalists in wrestling